National Schools' Regatta is the largest rowing regatta for junior rowers in Great Britain. Held annually in May, the three day regatta offers events for junior rowers between the categories J14 and J18.

History
The regatta was first raced in 1947 as the "Colts and Third Eights Regatta", when Desmond Hill the master-in-charge of rowing at St Edward's School, Oxford, invited the third VIIIs of Shrewsbury School, Bedford School and Radley College to race against St. Edwards in Godstow. The event was repeated annually at a number of locations in the Thames Valley, and then later at Pangbourne, until in 1963 when it moved to the Child Beale Trust Estate. With the growth of the regatta and the addition of many more events for junior crews the regatta changed its name to "The National Schools' Regatta" in 1964.

In 1973 the regatta moved to the National Water Centre, at Holme Pierrepont, due to the frequency of unfair weather conditions at the Child Beale Estate, and the ability to hold six lane racing at Holme Pierrepont. Weather conditions continued to be an issue for school rowing and the 2008 edition was cancelled after three 1st VIIIs, entered in the Childe Beale Cup, from The King's School, Canterbury, Bedford Modern School, and Shiplake College, swamped. It was decided by the officials to completely cancel the rest of the racing for both the Saturday and Sunday. The officials were criticised for not cancelling the event earlier and led to calls for the regatta to be moved to Dorney Lake, where the 2012 Olympics rowing events took place, although it is just as much prone to wind problems.
 
Owing to Holme Pierrepoint having organised a triathlon over the desired weekend, the organisers were forced to relocate the regatta to Dorney Lake in 2016, where it was held from 2017 onwards. The event was cancelled in 2020 due to the COVID-19 pandemic.

Notably in 2021 Eton College became the first boat club in recent history to win the 1,2,3 of 1st, 2nd & 3rd eight events.

Events and Recent Winners

Queen Mother Challenge Cup (Ch.8+)

The Queen Mother Challenge Cup for championship eights is the regatta's premier event, featuring the first eights of the traditional, 'championship' rowing schools of England. The event attracts approximately 12 entries each year, with smaller schools usually entering the Child Beale Cup for School eights. The Queen Mother forms part of the title known as 'The Triple', which also consists of Championship eights at the Schools' Head of the River Race and The Princess Elizabeth Challenge Cup at Henley Royal Regatta. Due to the high level of competition, the Queen Mother Challenge Cup has only been won by nine schools and one club:

Eton College (20 wins),
Hampton School (6 wins),
Abingdon School (5 wins),
Radley College (5 wins),
Shrewsbury School (3 wins),
St. Edward's School (3 wins), St Paul's School (3 wins), Westminster School (2 wins),
Pangbourne College (1 win),
Wallingford Schools Boat Club (1 win). 

Other schools that have come close to winning but thus far only achieved silver medals include Canford School, King's School Canterbury, King's School Chester, Emanuel School, Kingston Grammar and Shiplake College.

Winners

The Aylings Challenge Cup (ChG.8+)
The Aylings Challenge Cup for Championship Girls Eights has become the blue riband event for junior sweep women, with increasing entries in recent years to match the increase of junior women's rowing across the UK. A notable success has been that of Headington School who retained the trophy for 9 consecutive years between 2009 and 2017. The Aylings Challenge Cup makes up one of the three trophies for the Junior Women's Eights Triple, including Girls' Ch8+ at Schools' Head of the River and the Peabody Cup at Henley Women's Regatta.

Winners

Non-Championship Eights 
Non-Championship Eights (formerly the Child Beale trophy for First Eights) was an event for School and Club VIIIs and was traditionally entered by smaller and less well established or funded schools. There is a similar event named First Eights at Schools' Head of the River. The event was last held in 2019. One month later at Henley, Championship and Non-Championship eights race together in the Princess Elizabeth Challenge Cup.

Recent Winners

Course Records
Event results do not currently include 2017 due to no public timing results.

Notes

References

External links 
 Official website

Rowing competitions in the United Kingdom
Recurring sporting events established in 1947
1947 establishments in England
Scholastic rowing in the United Kingdom